A bust of Martin Luther King Jr. by the American artist John Woodrow Wilson is located at the United States Capitol rotunda in Washington, D.C.

Description
The bust depicts Dr. Martin Luther King Jr. in a contemplative and peaceful mood, looking slightly downward, patinated to match the black marble base.

History
The bust was unveiled in the Rotunda on January 16, 1986, by Dr. King's wife Coretta, their four children, and Dr. King's sister, Christine King Farris.

See also

 List of artworks commemorating African Americans in Washington, D.C.
 Statue of Martin Luther King Jr. (Austin, Texas)
 Memorials to Martin Luther King Jr.
 Bust of Martin Luther King Jr. (Alston)
 Bust of Martin Luther King, Jr. (Jersey City)
 Civil rights movement in popular culture

References

1986 establishments in Washington, D.C.
1986 sculptures
Bronze sculptures in Washington, D.C.
Busts in Washington, D.C.
Memorials to Martin Luther King Jr.
Monuments and memorials in Washington, D.C.
Sculptures of Martin Luther King Jr.
Sculptures of men in Washington, D.C.
United States Capitol art